Gozd is a small village in the Municipality of Kamnik in the Upper Carniola region of Slovenia. It includes the hamlets of Brška Vas, Gornja Vas, and Laze, as well as several isolated farms: Zabrezje or Brezovje, Brezovnik, Repovničar, Kajžar, Strahon, Hrastnik, Breg, and Zabrinje.

Name
The settlement was historically attested under a variety of names: first as German Spizholz in 1257, and then as Latin in Silua (1313) and German auf dem Walde (1318). The Slovene name Gozd is semantically identical to the German and Latin names (meaning 'forest') and is derived from the common noun gozd 'forest'. Locally, the settlement is known as Gojzd (adjective form gojški), and the Gozd Pasture on the Big Pasture Plateau is named after the village. In the past the German name was Goisd.

Church

The parish church in the settlement is dedicated to Saint Anne.

References

External links 

Gozd on Geopedia

Populated places in the Municipality of Kamnik